Carried Away may refer to:

Films and television
Carried Away (1996 film), a 1996 film 
Carried Away (2009 film), a 2009 film
"Carried Away", an episode of Arthur
"Carried Away", a 2019 episode of the television series Mickey Mouse

Music
Carried Away (band), a Canadian contemporary Christian band
Carried Away (People Under the Stairs album), 2009
Carried Away (Ooberman album), 2006
"Carried Away" (George Strait song), 1996
"Carried Away" (Olivia Newton-John song), 1981
"Carried Away" (Passion Pit song), 2013
"Carried Away", a song by Hayden from Skyscraper National Park
"Carried Away", a song by Kylie Minogue from CD single Wow
"Carried Away", a song by Sonicflood from Sonicflood
"Carried Away", a song from the 1944 musical On the Town
"Carried Away", a song by Carried Away from Closer to You
"Carried Away", a song by H.E.R. from I Used to Know Her
"Carried Away", a song by Surf Mesa and Madison Beer, 2021.

Video games
Carried Away (video game), a 2017 construction simulator video game